Jean Lesley Patricia Drake, Baroness Drake, CBE (born 16 January 1948) is a British trade unionist and Labour  life peer in the House of Lords.

After attending university, Drake worked as a research officer at the National Union of Public Employees, before moving to the Civil and Public Services Association in 1976. She was a Deputy General Secretary of the National Communications Union and, following a merger in 1995, she held the same position in the Communication Workers Union until 2008. During her tenure, she was President of the Trades Union Congress in 2005.

Drake serves as a trustee of the O2 and Alliance & Leicester pension funds and has been a board member of the Pension Protection Fund since 2004, as well as other bodies in the pension sector. She has also served as a member of the Employment Appeal Tribunal.

She was a commissioner  of the Equality and Human Rights Commission from 2006 to 2009.

On 20 June 2010 she was created a life peer as Baroness Drake, of Shene in the County of Surrey.

References

Living people
1948 births
Commanders of the Order of the British Empire
Members of the General Council of the Trades Union Congress
Presidents of the Trades Union Congress
Labour Party (UK) life peers
Life peeresses created by Elizabeth II